The Most Wonderful Time of the Year may refer to:

 The Most Wonderful Time of the Year (film), a 2008 Christmas-themed television film
 The Most Wonderful Time of the Year (Mormon Tabernacle Choir album), 2010
 The Most Wonderful Time of the Year (Take 6 album), 2010
 The Most Wonderful Time of the Year (Scott Weiland album), 2011
 The Most Wonderful Time of the Year (Mark Vincent album), 2018
 "It's the Most Wonderful Time of the Year", a popular Christmas song written in 1963